Vladimir Sergeyevich Levshin (born 3 February 1983) is a former Russian professional football player.

Club career
He played 6 seasons in the Russian Football National League for 4 different clubs.

Honours
 Russian Second Division Zone East top scorer: 2006 (22 goals).

References

External links
 

1983 births
Living people
Russian footballers
Association football forwards
FC SKA Rostov-on-Don players
FC Salyut Belgorod players
FC Metallurg Lipetsk players
FC Baltika Kaliningrad players
FC Zvezda Irkutsk players
FC Rostov players
FC Nosta Novotroitsk players